The third season of Indonesia Mencari Bakat, a reality television series, will premiered on September 14, 2012. This season is the first season without judge Sarah Sechan and Rianti Cartwright. They were replaced with pop singer Syahrini, as announced on June 20, 2012.

Preliminary auditions
Producers' auditions were held in Yogyakarta, Makassar, Surabaya, Denpasar, Medan, Bandung, and Jakarta.

Live theater auditions took place in the Trans TV's studio :

Production
The show's executive produce announced on the press conference in June 2012 that there will be new graphics, lighting, theme music, show intro and a larger live audience. Sarah Sechan, Titi Sjuman and Addie MS all expected to return as judges, in addition to Ananda Omesh who returned as host. Rianti Cartwright was replaced with pop singer, Syahrini. In the middle of production, Sarah Sechan resigned from this show, and will be replaced by a guest judge every week. Promotional videos began airing in June 2012.

References 

2012 Indonesian television seasons